Nikola Petrov may refer to:

Nikola Petroff (1873–1925), Bulgarian wrestler
Nikola Petrov (terrorist), Bulgarian terrorist
Nikola Petrov (painter) (1881-1916) Bulgarian artist

See also
 Nikolai Petrov (disambiguation)